Pan y Circo (Spanish for "Bread and Circus") is a Mexican Spanish-language talk show TV series that premiered on Amazon Video on August 7, 2020. The show is hosted by actor Diego Luna and was produced by La Corriente del Golfo, a production company run by Luna and fellow Mexican actor Gael García Bernal. In each episode, Luna and six guests sit for a meal prepared by a notable Mexican chef and discuss some sociopolitical issue. The guests include politicians, activists, academics, artists and celebrities. The show's first episode was filmed last, during the COVID-19 pandemic, and shows Luna and his guests all sitting at home, eating while videoconferencing together.

Episodes

Reception
Inkoo Kang of The Hollywood Reporter criticized the choice of guests as leading to tepid conversations, giving as an example the episode on abortion, which did not include anyone opposed to abortion. She did single out two episodes for praise: the episode on the drug war, and especially the episode on immigration, in which she wrote it was "truly fascinating" to hear Mexicans wrestle with their own country's anti-immigrant attitudes.

See also
 Dinner for Five
 Red Table Talk

References

External links
 

2020 Mexican television series debuts
Mexican television talk shows
Amazon Prime Video original programming